The dot-backed antbird (Hylophylax punctulatus) is a species of bird in the family Thamnophilidae. It is found in Bolivia, Brazil, Colombia, Ecuador, French Guiana, Peru, and Venezuela. Its natural habitat is subtropical or tropical swamps.

References

dot-backed antbird
Birds of the Amazon Basin
dot-backed antbird
Taxonomy articles created by Polbot